William B. Wiegand was a vice president of Columbian Carbon Co., known for his pioneering work on carbon black technology.  Wiegand studied carbon black's reinforcing effect on rubber, and proposed that the effect arises due to forces acting at the interface between the carbon black and the surrounding elastomer matrix.  He was a pioneer in developing the furnace method for producing carbon black.  Wiegand was the 1923 ACS rubber division chair. He received the Colwyn medal in 1956 and the Charles Goodyear Medal in 1960.

References

American business executives
Year of birth missing
Place of birth missing
Year of death missing
Place of death missing